4 days in May (Vier Tage im Mai) is a war drama film directed by Achim von Borries and starring Paul Wenzel and Aleksei Guskov. It is a German-Russian-Ukrainian co-production. The film was released on August 9, 2011, at the Locarno Film Festival.

The official slogan is: "Sometimes the border goes not between “them” and “us”, but between good and evil".

Plot 
It is one of the last days before the capitulation of Nazi Germany in May 1945. The setting is the Baltic coast in Pomerania. A unit of the Soviet Army, comprising seven men and led by a captain nicknamed "Gorynych" ("dragon") (Aleksei Guskov) by his companions, has left for reconnaissance and observation of the movements of the retreating Germans. The group is housed in a large building, a shelter for orphaned girls. A German Army detachment is situated close by, awaiting transport for evacuation by sea to Denmark, where they plan to surrender to the British. Both parties understand that the war is almost over; they do not want to engage each other and choose to wait things out. But resistance is not over for a teenage orphan Peter (Paul Wenzel), who was indoctrinated in the "no surrender" tradition of National Socialism. Soviet intelligence officers disarm him and patiently try to neutralize his youthful aggression.

On May 8, 1945, Victory in Europe Day, a Soviet major who is commander of the division that includes the reconnaissance unit, arrives with Red Army troops. He was drunk on the occasion of Germany's capitulation. The major tries to rape one of the German girls, but the captain disarms him and stops the attempt.  Wishing to eliminate witnesses of his indecent behavior, the major said that the enemy, in disguise, infiltrated the building, and began an assault by his unit. The German detachment did not surrender but came to rescue the children. Then they made provisions for the safe withdrawal of the orphans on a fishing launch to Denmark.

Cast 
 Paul Wenzel as Peter
 Aleksei Guskov as Captain, commander of the reconnaissance
 Ivan Shvedoff as Trubitsin, scout
 Andrew Merzlikin as Gray, the scout
 Sergei Legostaev as Ivanov, a scout
 Grigoriy Dobrygin as Fedyunin
 Merab Ninidze as Major
 Gerald Alexander Held as Colonel Wald
 Martin Brambach as Lt. Wendt
 Angelina Häntsch as Anna
 Petra Kelling as patroness of the shelter

Reliability 
Aleksei Guskov, the producer and the lead actor, based the screenplay on a work by Dmitry Faust. The author, telling the story of Marshal of the Soviet Union, K. Moskalenko, described the reported case of German troops coming to the aid of the small Soviet reconnaissance unit. Scouts prevented the drunken major - a tank officer - from raping a German girl. The plausibility of the story was supported by its publication in the prestigious Russian historical illustrated magazine Rodina. However, the same journal contained an article by Boris Sokolov, in which he called into question the authenticity of the political report quoted by Dmitry Faust. Later, other historians argued that the story was totally fictional, unsupported by archival documents. In particular, the Russian historian Alexei Isaev said Faust had actually written about the "brotherhood of the weapon" on the island of Rügen.

Awards 
 Special Jury Award: For courage and humanism, and the prize "Golden Boat" in the "Vyborg Account" film festival "Window to Europe"(Vyborg, 2011).

See also 
 The Last Battle: When U.S. and German Soldiers Joined Forces in the Waning Hours of World War II in Europe, a book about the Battle for Castle Itter

References
The information in this article is based on that in its Russian equivalent.

 The magazine "Around the World" № 5, 2006.

External links
 
 
 Card "for 4 days in May" in the public register of films MC RF

2011 films
2010s Russian-language films
2010s German-language films
2010s English-language films
German war drama films
Russian historical drama films
Russian war drama films
2011 war drama films
Eastern Front of World War II films
Films about orphans
Ukrainian war drama films
German historical drama films
Ukrainian historical drama films
2011 drama films
Russian World War II films
German World War II films
Ukrainian World War II films
2011 multilingual films
German multilingual films
Russian multilingual films
2010s German films